Nathaniel Wilson may refer to:

 Ranji Wilson (1886–1953), rugby football player for New Zealand
 Nathaniel S. Wilson (born 1947), American sailmaker, rigger, and sail designer
 Kool G Rap (born 1968), American rapper

See also
 Nathanael Wilson (died 1695), English Anglican priest